The Town (Persian: شهرک, romanized: Shahrak) is a 2022 Iranian drama film directed by Ali Hazrati and written by Ali Hazrati.  The film screened for the first time at the 40th Fajr Film Festival and received 3 nominations.

Premise 
Navid Falahati (Saed Soheili) is a young man interested in acting. He is accepted in the testing of a big production movie and in order to join this project and achieve his long-held dream of becoming an actor, he has to accept the special conditions and mental training of the actors in an isolated town.

Cast 

 Saed Soheili  as Navid
 Mahtab Servati  as Fereshteh
 Kazem Sayahi 
 Roya Javidnia 
 Homayoun Ershadi 
 Shahrokh Forootanian 
 Morteza Zarrabi 
 Saghi Hajipour as Homa

Reception

Accolades

References 

2022 films
Iranian drama films
2020s Persian-language films
2022 drama films